The Caspian kutum (Rutilus kutum) or Caspian white fish is a member of the family Cyprinidae from  brackish water habitats of the  Caspian Sea and from its freshwater tributaries. It is typically a medium-sized fish, reaching 45–55 cm in length, rarely 70 cm, and weighing up to 4.00 kg, rarely 5.00 kg. It used to be very common and was harvested commercially. The population seems to have collapsed due to overfishing and marine pollution. Its flesh and roe are enjoyed as food, and highly prized in the Gilan and Mazandaran provinces in Iran.

Feeding
The main food items are mollusks, shrimp, amphipods, and crabs. Larvae and fry feed on rotifers, minute forms of cladocerans, diatom algae, and larvae of copepods.

Population
Three populations (one autumn and two spring populations) were found in the rivers of Iran; a freshwater form exists in the South Caspian.

Distribution
Caspian kutum is endemic to the Caspian Sea. It is distributed from the mouth of the Volga River up to the Miankaleh Peninsula. Main aggregations are confined to the southwestern part of the sea adjacent to the Anzali and Qizilchay Bays. On the eastern coast, it occurs in the Atrek estuarine areas and in the Iranian waters.

Behavior
This species lives in small schools in deep water, but spawns in shallow water in the tributaries in April–May. The eggs are laid among weeds or over gravel, and hatch in about 10 days. They become sexually mature in 3–5 years. Resilience of this species is low. Minimum population doubling time is 4.5 – 14 years.

The fish is also called Caspian white fish and Caspian roach, and is known as kutum in Russian, kütüm in Azerbaijani, and māhi sefid in Persian.

See also
Rutilus frisii

References

Fish described in 1901
Fish of Central Asia
Fish of Russia
Fish of the Caspian Sea
Cyprinid fish of Asia
kutum